American country music singer and songwriter Luke Combs has released three studio albums, four extended plays and sixteen singles.

Studio albums

Extended plays

Singles

As lead artist

As featured artist

Promotional singles

Other charted and certified songs

Music videos

Notes

References 

Country music discographies
Discographies of American artists